"Heads Carolina, Tails California" is a song written by Tim Nichols and Mark D. Sanders and recorded by American country music artist Jo Dee Messina.  The song was released in January 1996 as her debut single and served as the lead-off single for her self-titled debut album.  The song reached the Top 10 on both the U.S. and Canadian country charts.

American Aquarium covered the song on their 2021 album Slappers, Bangers, and Certified Twangers: Vol 1. The song enjoyed a revival in 2022 when it was used as the basis for Cole Swindell's number one hit "She Had Me at Heads Carolina".

Content
"Heads Carolina, Tails California" is an up-tempo song about a narrator who wants to just take her love and run off together somewhere, but anywhere will do as long as her love comes with her.

Critical reception
Deborah Evans Price, of Billboard magazine reviewed the song favorably, calling it a "rollicking country ode to flipping a coin and hitting the road in search of a better life 'somewhere greener, somewhere warmer.'" She goes on to say that "passion and energy permeate Messina's strong vocal attacks on this infectious tune."

In 2022, Cole Swindell, Ashley Gorley, Jesse Frasure, and Thomas Rhett re-wrote the song as "She Had Me at Heads Carolina", which heavily references "Heads Carolina, Tails California" and incorporates its melody. Additional co-writers' credit was also given to Sanders and Nichols. This song appears on Swindell's 2022 album Stereotype, from which it was released as the third single. On November 7, 2022, Swindell released a remixed version of the song which featured new vocals by Messina.

Music video
A music video was released for the song directed by Roger Pistole and filmed in the Mojave Desert. Messina is shown performing with an old-fashioned microphone in a run-down wooden shack in the desert and leaning against the counter of a diner, dressed as a waitress. Throughout the video are scenes of men traveling on an old dirt road pushing tires with them. They are seen sitting in the diner that Messina is seen in, and outside of a rural gas station in which the diner is located.

Chart performance
"Heads Carolina, Tails California" debuted at number 70 on the U.S. Billboard Hot Country Singles & Tracks for the week of January 27, 1996. It would soon reach number 2 on that chart, behind "My Maria" by Brooks & Dunn.

Year-end charts

Certifications

References

1996 debut singles
1996 songs
Jo Dee Messina songs
Songs written by Tim Nichols
Songs written by Mark D. Sanders
Song recordings produced by Byron Gallimore
Song recordings produced by Tim McGraw
Curb Records singles
Songs about California